Rukwanzi Island is a disputed island in the southern portion of Lake Albert in Central Africa. It is home to approximately 1000 fishermen.

Ownership dispute
Rukwanzi is the subject of an ownership dispute between the Democratic Republic of the Congo and Uganda, which are situated on opposite sides of the lake. In late July 2007, Congo apprehended four Ugandan soldiers it said had crossed the dividing line in the lake, and on August 3, 2007, the countries' militaries engaged in a skirmish near the island, with one Briton and one Congolese killed. On August 12, 2007, Congo occupied the area.

See also 
 Energy in Uganda

References

Disputed islands
Lake islands of Africa
Islands of Africa
Territorial disputes of Uganda
Territorial disputes of the Democratic Republic of the Congo
Democratic Republic of the Congo–Uganda border
Lake Albert (Africa)